Baryaji Rural District is in the Central District of Sardasht County, West Azerbaijan province, Iran. At the National Census of 2006, its population was 11,658 in 2,295 households. There were 12,382 inhabitants in 2,882 households at the following census of 2011. At the most recent census of 2016, the population of the rural district was 11,924 in 3,159 households. The largest of its 76 villages was Boyuran-e Sofla, with 1,309 people.

References 

Sardasht County

Rural Districts of West Azerbaijan Province

Populated places in West Azerbaijan Province

Populated places in Sardasht County